Zoula is a small village in the Ogooué-Ivindo province of Gabon halfway between Mékambo and Mazingo.

Latitude: 1.0833 N
Longitude: 14.0667 E
Altitude: 508 m (1,669 ft)

Populated places in Ogooué-Ivindo Province